Japan Air Lines Flight 472 was an aircraft hijacking carried out by the Japanese Red Army (JRA) on 28 September 1977.

Incident 
The Douglas DC-8, en route from Paris to Haneda Airport in Tokyo with 156 people on board, stopped in Bombay, India. Shortly after taking off from Bombay, five armed JRA members, led by Osamu Maruoka, hijacked the aircraft and ordered it flown to Dhaka, Bangladesh. At Dhaka, the hijackers took the passengers and crew hostage, demanding US$6 million and the release of nine imprisoned JRA members. The Chief of Air Staff of Bangladesh Air Force,  AG Mahmud, negotiated with the hijackers from the control tower. Things were further complicated at the airport when on 1 October 1977 Bangladesh Air Force mutinied with the lead negotiator almost being killed. The next day (29 September), five hostages were released, including American actress Carole Wells, who was on her honeymoon with her husband, former California assemblyman Walter J. Karabian. Karabian remained on board.

On 1 October Prime Minister Takeo Fukuda announced that the Japanese government would accept the hijackers' demands, on the principle that "the life of a single person outweighs the earth." Six of the imprisoned JRA members were then released.

A chartered Japan Airlines flight carried the money and the six released JRA members to Dhaka, where the exchange took place on 2 October. The hijackers released 118 passengers and crew members. On 3 October, they flew to Kuwait City and Damascus, where they released eleven more hostages. Finally, the aircraft was flown to Algeria, where it was impounded by authorities and the remaining hostages were freed.

List of hijackers and released prisoners

Hijackers 
 	
  , is still at large
 , is still at large
 
 , hasn’t been charged with this hijacking

Released prisoners 
 , is still at large
 
 , is still at large
 
 
 , is still at large

Aftermath 
The incident contrasted the European and American approach of non-negotiation with terrorists to Japan's approach of appeasing terrorists if necessary. Shortly after the incident, Japan's National Police Agency established a Special Assault Team to deal with future acts of terrorism. Several of the JRA terrorists involved in the hijacking have yet to be apprehended and their current whereabouts are unknown.

Osamu Maruoka, who also led the hijacking of Japan Air Lines Flight 404 in 1973, escaped and remained a fugitive until 1987 when he was arrested in Tokyo after entering Japan on a forged passport. Given a life sentence, he died in prison on 29 May 2011. Another of the hijackers, Jun Nishikawa, eventually returned to Japan, was arrested, convicted and sentenced to life imprisonment.

Further reading
 Wells, Carole HIJACKED: An Eyewitness Account of Evil (MotherBird Productions, 14 September 2018)
 Mahmud, A. G. "My Destiny" (Academic Press and Publishers Library 2013)

See also 
 List of hostage crises

Notes

References
 

1977 in Japan
1977 in Bangladesh
Aircraft hijackings
Aviation accidents and incidents in Bangladesh
Aviation accidents and incidents in 1977
Hostage taking in Bangladesh
472
Accidents and incidents involving the Douglas DC-8
1977 crimes in Bangladesh
September 1977 events in Asia
Terrorist incidents in Japan in 1977
1977 crimes in Japan
September 1977 crimes
Japanese Red Army